KFHL (91.7 FM) is a radio station licensed to Wasco, California, United States, the station serves the Bakersfield area.  The station is currently owned by Mary V. Harris Foundation.

History
The station was assigned the KFHL call letters on 2003-02-07.

References

External links

FHL
Radio stations established in 2003
FHL
2003 establishments in California